Hu-Man is a 1975 French science fiction film directed by Jérôme Laperrousaz.

Plot
An actor is put in precarious situations while his fear is broadcast to a television audience. The audience's emotions determine whether he is sent to the past or future.

Cast
 Terence Stamp as Terence
 Jeanne Moreau as Sylvana
 Agnès Stevenin as Viviane
 Frederik van Pallandt as Frédérik
 Franck Schwacke as Frank
 Gabriella Rysted as Gabriella
 Giannis Thomas as L'homme oiseau/Birdman
 Valerie Decaux as L'enfant
 Bob Traynor as Technicien
 Frank Holman as Unknown (uncredited)

Accolades

References

External links
 

French science fiction films
1970s French-language films
English-language French films
1970s English-language films
1970s science fiction films
1975 multilingual films
French multilingual films
1970s French films